{{Infobox person
| name               = Leslie Phillips
| honorific_suffix   = 
| image              = LesliePhillipsBAFTA07 crop.jpg
| alt                = 
| caption            = Phillips at the 60th British Academy Film Awards in 2007
| birth_name         = Leslie Samuel Phillips
| birth_date         = 
| birth_place        = Tottenham, Middlesex, England
| death_date         = 
| death_place        = London, England
| occupation         = 
| years_active       = 1937–2015
| known for          = Carry OnHarry Potter
| spouse             = 
| children           = 4
}}

Leslie Samuel Phillips  (20 April 1924 – 7 November 2022) was an English actor, director, producer and author. He achieved prominence in the 1950s, playing smooth, upper-class comic roles utilising his "Ding dong" and "Hello" catchphrases. He appeared in the Carry On and Doctor in the House film series as well as the long-running BBC radio comedy series The Navy Lark. 
In his later career, Phillips took on dramatic parts including a BAFTA-nominated role alongside Peter O'Toole in Venus (2006). He provided the voice of the Sorting Hat in several of the Harry Potter films.

Early life
Leslie Samuel Phillips was born in Tottenham on 20 April 1924, the third child of Cecelia Margaret (née Newlove) and Frederick Samuel Phillips, who worked at Glover and Main, manufacturers of cookers in Edmonton. Phillips described his street as "beyond the sonic reach of the Bow Bells but within the general footprint of cockneydom." In 1931, the family moved to Chingford, where Phillips attended Larkswood Primary School. Consequently, Phillips has described himself as both a cockney and an Essex boy. In 1935, his father died at 44, having suffered from a weak heart and oedema brought on by the "filthy, sulphurous" air of the factory.

After his father's death, Phillips was sent to the Italia Conti Academy at his mother's insistence. There, he attended drama, dance and notably elocution to lose his cockney accent; at the time, a regional accent was considered an impediment to an aspiring actor. Phillips took time to refine his Received Pronunciation accent, and later declared that "the biggest elocution lessons came from mixing with people who sounded right, people in theatrical circles and in the officers' mess during the war." He left school at 14 in 1938.

Career
Early work
Phillips made his stage debut in 1937 as a wolf in Peter Pan alongside Anna Neagle at the London Palladium. In the 1938–39 season, he was promoted to the role of John Napoleon Darling, alongside Jean Forbes-Robertson as Peter and Seymour Hicks as Captain Hook. Acting allowed Phillips to earn extra money for his family, who had struggled financially after his father's death.

Phillips made his first film appearance in the 1938 musical comedy Lassie from Lancashire. He made further uncredited appearances in Climbing High (1938) and The Mikado (1939), among the earliest films made at Pinewood Studios. Upon the 70th anniversary of the studios in 2006, Phillips considered himself one of the earliest actors to have worked there still alive and working. A minor part in Ealing Studios' The Proud Valley (1940) afforded Phillips the chance to work alongside Paul Robeson, whom he greatly admired.

In the early years of the Second World War, Phillips worked in the West End for Binkie Beaumont and H. M. Tennent. The shows were frequently interrupted by air-raid sirens and Phillips later recalled that "audiences would evaporate and head for cellars or Underground stations". Called up to the British Army in 1942, Phillips rose to the rank of lance-bombardier in the Royal Artillery. Due to his acquired upper class accent, Phillips was selected for officer training at Catterick and duly commissioned as a second lieutenant in the Royal Artillery in 1943. He was transferred to the Durham Light Infantry in 1944 but was later declared unfit for service just before D-Day after being diagnosed with a neurological condition that caused partial paralysis. He was initially sent to a psychiatric hospital in error before moving to the correct facility for treatment.

Demobbed as a lieutenant in December 1944, Phillips' acting career initially took in "the murkiest rat-infested old playhouses and music halls in the north of England". He resumed his career as a film player, making uncredited appearances in Anna Karenina and Powell and Pressburger's The Red Shoes (both 1948). His first lead role in a television serial was in the sitcom My Wife Jacqueline (1952).

His big break in the films was in the Gene Kelly musical Les Girls (1957). Although the film was a critical success, he decided against a move to Hollywood, in part as he considered himself primarily a theatre actor and did not want to become "the poor man's David Niven". He began appearing in character roles in British comedy films including Brothers in Law and The Smallest Show on Earth (both 1957). In 1959, Phillips was cast in a minor role as Jack Bell in Carry On Nurse, the second in the Carry On film series. The character's exclamation of "Ding dong" in the film became a popular catchphrase for Phillips. He became strongly associated with smooth-talking, libidinous roles, and his catchphrases "Ding dong", "I say" and "Hello" entered common usage in the United Kingdom. Phillips cemented his image in two further Carry On films, Carry On Teacher (1959) and Carry On Constable (1960) before telling producer Peter Rogers that he did not wish to appear in any more. Carry On director Gerald Thomas cast Phillips in several other comedy films; Please Turn Over (1959) features Phillips as Dr. Henry Manners, a respectable family doctor portrayed as a philanderer in a book written by 17-year-old Jo Halliday (Julia Lockwood), while he plays father David Robinson opposite Geraldine McEwan in No Kidding (1960).

Between 1959 and 1977, Phillips became familiar on radio, as Sub-Lieutenant Phillips in the comedy The Navy Lark alongside Jon Pertwee and Ronnie Barker. He also appeared in the film version of The Navy Lark (1959), the only cast member of the radio series to do so.

In 1960, Phillips was cast in Doctor in Love, the fourth film in the Doctor comedy series and the first without Dirk Bogarde. He appeared in two further installments, Doctor in Clover (1966) and Doctor in Trouble (1970). Phillips appeared in several comedy films directed by Ken Annakin, often cast alongside his Doctor co-star James Robertson Justice, including Very Important Person (1961), Raising the Wind (1961) and Crooks Anonymous (1962). In 1962, Phillips and Justice starred with Stanley Baxter in Annakin's The Fast Lady, one of Britain's biggest box office hits of the year.  A loose sequel, Father Came Too!, followed in 1964. 

During the 1960s, Phillips appeared on television in two plays penned by the comedy writing team Galton and Simpson; "Impasse", broadcast as part of Comedy Playhouse in 1963, and "The Suit", a 1969 episode of The Galton & Simpson Comedy. The latter was developed into a full series four years later, Casanova '73, starring Phillips as compulsive philanderer Henry Newhouse. The programme was poorly received and attracted criticism from Mary Whitehouse of the National Viewers' and Listeners' Association for its risque content.

Later work
By the early 1980s, Phillips considered his suave and lecherous roles to be "a bit of a rut" and looked to branch out into dramatic roles. A relatively minor part in Out of Africa (1985) facilitated a larger role in Steven Spielberg's Empire of the Sun (1987). To play an emaciated prisoner of war in the film, Phillips lost more than two stone. He became busy as a character actor in both stage and television productions including Scandal (1989) and Lara Croft: Tomb Raider (2001). In 1992, he returned to the Carry On series in the poorly-received Carry On Columbus. Phillips also provided the voice for the Sorting Hat in the Harry Potter films, appearing in Harry Potter and the Philosopher's Stone (2001), Harry Potter and the Chamber of Secrets (2002) and the final film, Harry Potter and the Deathly Hallows – Part 2 (2011).

Phillips appeared in British television sitcoms including Honey for Tea with Felicity Kendal and appeared in guest roles in popular series such as The Bill, Holby City and Midsomer Murders. In 2006, he played veteran actor Ian alongside Peter O'Toole in Hanif Kureishi's film Venus. For this role, he was nominated for a BAFTA for Best Supporting Actor in 2007. Phillips' autobiography, Hello, was published by Orion in 2006.

He was appointed Officer of the Order of the British Empire (OBE) in the 1998 Birthday Honours and was promoted to Commander of the Order of the British Empire (CBE) in the 2008 New Year Honours.

Phillips, in conjunction with Jules Williams and Back Door Productions, co-produced the Sky Arts series Living The Life which ran for three series, ending in 2013.

He continued to act until 2012 and continued to make television appearances until 2015 when he was interviewed on the BBC One programme VE Day: Remembering Victory.

Personal life, illness and death
Phillips married his first wife, actress Penelope Bartley (1925–1981), on 30 May 1948. The couple had four children. In 1962, Phillips began a relationship with actress Caroline Mortimer, daughter of writer Penelope Mortimer and stepdaughter of John Mortimer, who was an understudy in a stage play in which Phillips starred. Phillips and Bartley separated at that point and were divorced in 1965.

After his relationship with Mortimer ended, Phillips embarked on a relationship with Australian actress Vicki Luke, with whom he lived for approximately three years.

Phillips moved in with actress Angela Scoular in 1977, at which time she was pregnant by another actor. He raised her son as his own. While on tour in Australia in 1981, he was notified that Bartley had died in a fire. Phillips chose to continue in the production and did not attend her funeral. He later acknowledged that his family had never forgiven him for this decision.

Phillips married Scoular in 1982. In 1992 Scoular, who suffered from bipolar disorder, attempted suicide but was not sectioned. Scoular died on 11 April 2011 after drinking a corrosive drain cleaner and suffering unsurvivable 40% burns to her throat, body and dietary tract. She had suffered from bowel cancer and although was later declared cancer-free, she became anxious that the cancer had returned. Phillips was too ill to attend the inquest into Scoular's death three months later. The coroner ruled that Scoular's death was not suicide, but rather that she had "killed herself while the balance of her mind was disturbed".

Phillips received the Freedom of the City of London on 16 November 2010. Phillips was a supporter of Tottenham Hotspur, and made an appearance as part of the half-time entertainment during the team's home match against Swansea City on 1 April 2012.

On 20 December 2013, at the age of 89, Phillips married his third wife, Zara Carr.

Phillips suffered two strokes six months apart at the age of 90. After a long illness, he died in his sleep at home in London on 7 November 2022, aged 98.

Filmography
Film

Selected television

Selected radioThe Navy Lark (1959–1977)Three Men in a Boat (1962)The TV Lark (1963) 

Other voice work
Voice of Gex in the European release of Gex: Enter the Gecko''
Voice of cat in Iams advertising
Voice of the captain of the Virgin Atlantic safety video (1996–2004)

References

External links

Interview at Britmovie.co.uk
Interview at Den Of Geek

Obituary at BFI 

1924 births
2022 deaths
People from Tottenham
Alumni of the Italia Conti Academy of Theatre Arts
British Army personnel of World War II
British male comedy actors
Commanders of the Order of the British Empire
Durham Light Infantry officers
English male film actors
English male radio actors
English male stage actors
English male television actors
English male video game actors
English male voice actors
English writers
Male actors from London
Royal Artillery officers
20th-century English male actors
21st-century English male actors